The Graham Avenue station is a station on the BMT Canarsie Line of the New York City Subway. Located at the intersection of Graham and Metropolitan Avenues in Williamsburg, Brooklyn, it is served by the L train at all times.

History
This station opened on June 30, 1924 as part of the initial segment of the Canarsie Line, which was a product of the Dual Contracts, stretching from Sixth Avenue to Montrose Avenue.

Station layout

 
This underground station has two tracks and two side platforms. Both platforms have their original mosaic tile band showing various shades of green and blue with peach and yellow borders. "G" tablets on a dark blue background run at regular intervals. The mosaic name tablets read "GRAHAM AVE." in gold serif lettering on a blue background and gold border. There are no columns on either platform.

Exits
Each platform has one same-level fare control area towards the west end (railroad north). Each one has a turnstile bank and two street stairs. The ones on the Manhattan-bound side go up to either northern corners of Graham and Metropolitan Avenues while the ones on the Canarsie-bound side go up to either southern corners. The Manhattan-bound fare control area has a full-time sales booth while the booth on the Canarsie-bound one is for informational use only. There are no crossovers or crossunders.

References

External links 

 
 Station Reporter — L Train
 The Subway Nut — Graham Avenue Pictures 
 Graham Avenue entrance from Google Maps Street View
 Platforms from Google Maps Street View (2015)
 Platforms from Google Maps Street View (2018)

BMT Canarsie Line stations
New York City Subway stations in Brooklyn
Railway stations in the United States opened in 1924
Williamsburg, Brooklyn
1924 establishments in New York City